Pyramidula chorismenostoma is a species of very small air-breathing land snail, a terrestrial pulmonate gastropod mollusk or micromollusk in the family Pyramidulidae.

Shell description 
The normal condition of the shell of this species is scalarid, i.e. the whorls of the shell are not attached to one another. This shell type is unique among the non-marine malacofauna of Europe.

The width of the shell is up to 2.2 mm, the height is up to 3.1 mm.

Distribution 
This species occurs in countries and islands including:
 Greece: approximately the southern 2/3 of Greece, Crete, and the Aegean islands.
 Western Turkey

References

Further reading 
 Mylonas M. 1982. New data on the taxonomy and distribution de Pyramidula rupestris chorismenostoma (Blanc). Malacologia, 22(1-2): 439–440.

Pyramidulidae
Gastropods described in 1879